Herald or The Herald is the name of various newspapers.

Herald or The Herald

Australia
 The Herald (Adelaide) and several similar names (1894–1924), a South Australian Labor weekly, then daily
 Barossa and Light Herald, (1951–), Tanunda, South Australia
 Fremantle Herald, Fremantle, Western Australia
 The Herald (1867–1886)
 Fremantle Herald (1913–1919)
 Fremantle Herald (1989–present)
 The Herald (Melbourne) (1840–1990)
 The Newcastle Herald, Newcastle, New South Wales
 The Port Phillip Herald and The Herald (Melbourne) (1840–1990), Melbourne, Victoria

Canada
 Calgary Herald, Calgary, Alberta
 Lethbridge Herald, Lethbridge, Alberta
 Oxbow Herald, Oxbow, Saskatchewan - see List of newspapers in Canada
 Penticton Herald, Penticton, British Columbia

United Kingdom
 Brighton Herald (18061971), Brighton and Hove, England
 Bucks Herald, Buckinghamshire, England
 Eastbourne Herald, Eastbourne, England
 Falkirk Herald, Grangemouth, Scotland
 Fermanagh Herald, County Fermanagh, Northern Ireland
 The Herald (Glasgow), Glasgow, Scotland
 The Herald (Plymouth), Plymouth, England
 Ulster Herald, Omagh, Tyrone, Northern Ireland

United States
 The Albany Herald, Albany, Georgia
 The Badger Herald, Madison, Wisconsin
 Baker City Herald, Baker City, Oregon
 The Bellingham Herald, Bellingham, Washington
 Boston Herald, Boston, Massachusetts
 The Bradenton Herald, Bradenton, Florida
 Canby Herald, Oregon
 Cape May County Herald, Cape May County, New Jersey
 Chicago Herald (disambiguation), several newspapers in Chicago, Illinois
 Clinton Herald, Clinton, Iowa
 College Heights Herald, student newspaper, Western Kentucky University, Bowling Green, Kentucky
 The Concrete Herald, Concrete, Washington
 Dallas Herald (1849–1885), Dallas, Texas
 Dallas Herald (1886–1888), Dallas, Texas
 The Dickson Herald, Dickson, Tennessee
 The Daily Herald (Everett), Everett, Washington
 Grand Forks Herald, Grand Forks, North Dakota
 Headlight Herald (disambiguation), several newspapers
 Los Angeles Herald which merged with the Los Angeles Express  to form the Los Angeles Herald-Express  
 Miami Herald, Miami, Florida
 New York Herald (1835–1924), New York City, New York
 Northwest Herald, Crystal Lake, Illinois
 The Portsmouth Herald, Portsmouth, New Hampshire
 The Herald (Rock Hill), Rock Hill, South Carolina
 Rutland Herald, Rutland, Vermont
 San Francisco Herald, San Francisco, California
 The Herald (Sharon), Sharon, Pennsylvania
 Sierra Vista Herald, Sierra Vista, Arizona
 Statesboro Herald, Statesboro, Georgia
 Tri-City Herald, Kennewick, Washington
 Williston Herald, Williston, South Dakota
 Herald (Community of Christ), formerly The True Latter Day Saints' Herald and  The Saints' Herald

Other countries
 Buenos Aires Herald, Buenos Aires, Argentina
 Deccan Herald, Bangalore, India
 Gisborne Herald, New Zealand
 Suriname Herald, Paramaribo, a newspaper in Suriname
 The Herald (Ireland), Dublin, Ireland
 The Korea Herald, Seoul, South Korea

 Herald Malaysia, Kuala Lumpur, Malaysia
 The Herald Mexico, Mexico City, Mexico
 The New Zealand Herald, Auckland, New Zealand
 The Herald (Pakistan), Karachi, Pakistan
 The Herald (South Africa)
 The Herald (Zimbabwe), Harare, Zimbabwe

Daily Herald 
 Daily Herald (United Kingdom) (1912–1964), a left-wing British newspaper
 Daily Herald (Adelaide) (1910–1924), an Australian Labor Party newspaper in South Australia
 Daily Herald (Arlington Heights, Illinois), U.S.
 Austin Daily Herald, Austin, Minnesota, U.S.
 The Brown Daily Herald, the student newspaper of Brown University, Providence, Rhode Island, U.S.
 Daily Herald (Columbia, Tennessee), U.S.
 Daily Herald (Connecticut), a former weekly newspaper in Connecticut, U.S.
 Fairborn Daily Herald, Fairborn, Ohio
 Prince Albert Daily Herald, Prince Albert, Saskatchewan, Canada
 Daily Herald (Roanoke Rapids), North Carolina, U.S.
 Daily Herald (Sint Maarten) – see Outline of Saint Martin
 Tyrone Daily Herald, Tyrone, Pennsylvania, U.S.
 Daily Herald (Utah), Utah County, Utah, U.S.
 Wausau Daily Herald, Wausau, Wisconsin, U.S.
 The Daily Herald, a predecessor newspaper to the Sun Herald, Biloxi, Mississippi, U.S.
 The Daily Herald, a predecessor newspaper to The Mercury News, San Jose, California, U.S.

Evening Herald
Entries in this section are listed alphabetically by country, then by state/province or area
 Evening Herald, former name of The Herald (Ireland)
 The Evening Herald, former name of the historical The Wanganui Herald of New Zealand
 Evening Herald, a companion newspaper of the historical Morning Herald, United Kingdom
 Evening Herald, a former name of The Herald (Plymouth), United Kingdom
 Evening Herald, a predecessor of the Herald Express of the Torbay area, United Kingdom
 Los Angeles Evening Herald and Express, a former name of the historical Los Angeles Herald-Express in California, United States
 The Evening Herald, a former name of The Bradenton Herald in Florida, United States
 The Evening Herald, a predecessor of The Herald-Palladium of St. Joseph, Michigan, United States
 Shenandoah Evening Herald, a predecessor of the Republican Herald of Pottsville, Pennsylvania, United States
 The Evening Herald, former name of The Herald (Rock Hill) in South Carolina, United States
 Evening Herald, a predecessor of the Herald and News of Klamath Falls, Oregon, United States

Morning Herald 
 Morning Herald (1790–1869), an early newspaper in the United Kingdom
 Baltimore Morning Herald (1900–1906), Baltimore, Maryland, U.S.
 The Sydney Morning Herald, Sydney, Australia
 The Morning Herald, a predecessor of The Herald-Mail, Hagerstown, Maryland, U.S.

National Herald 
 The National Herald, New York City, U.S., focusing on the Greek-American community
 National Herald (India) (1938–2008), an Indian newspaper established by Jawaharlal Nehru

Sunday Herald 
 Sunday Graphic (1915–1960), also known as the Sunday Herald and Illustrated Sunday Herald
 Sunday Herald, Scotland
 Sunday Herald (Australia), Sunday edition of The Sydney Morning Herald now merged with the Sunday Sun to become The Sun-Herald
 Sunday Herald, based in Kingston, Jamaica
 Herald on Sunday, Sunday edition of The New Zealand Herald

Fictional
 The Washington Herald (House of Cards), a fictional daily investigative newspaper in the Netflix TV series House of Cards

See also

Herald Journal or Herald-Journal 
 The Herald Journal, in Northern Utah
 Spartanburg Herald-Journal, Spartanburg, South Carolina
 Syracuse Herald-Journal (1939–2001), Syracuse, New York, U.S.
 Herald Journal, Monticello, Indiana, U.S.

Press Herald, Press-Herald, Herald Press, or Herald-Press 
 The Herald-Press (Harvey, North Dakota), U.S.
 Huntington Herald-Press, Huntington County, Indiana, U.S.
 Minden Press-Herald, Minden, Louisiana, U.S.; see Bogalusa Daily News
 Portland Press Herald, Portland, Maine, U.S.
 Palestine Herald-Press, Palestine, Texas, U.S.

 The Herald-Press, a defunct Michigan newspaper that merged with The Herald-Palladium, U.S.

Tribune Herald, Tribune-Herald, Herald Tribune, or Herald-Tribune 
 Grande Prairie Daily Herald-Tribune, Grande Prairie, Alberta, Canada
 Hawaii Tribune-Herald, Hilo, Hawaii, U.S.
 Herald & Tribune (1869–present), Jonesborough, Tennessee, U.S.
 Hawke's Bay Herald-Tribune (1937–1999), Hawke's Bay, New Zealand
 International Herald Tribune (1967–2013)
 Latin American Herald Tribune, an online-only newspaper, Caracas, Venezuela
 New York Herald Tribune (1924–1966), New York, U.S.
 Sarasota Herald-Tribune, Sarasota, Florida, U.S.
 Waco Tribune-Herald, Waco, Texas, U.S.

Other 
 El Heraldo (disambiguation)
 Albany Democrat-Herald, Albany, Oregon, U.S.
 Athens Banner-Herald, Athens, Georgia, U.S.
 The Catholic Herald, London, England
 The Chronicle Herald, Halifax, Nova Scotia, Canada
 Dallas Times Herald (1888–1991), Dallas, Texas
 Gazette and Herald, North Wiltshire, England
 Hawaii Catholic Herald, Honolulu, Hawaii, U.S.
 The Herald-Dispatch, Huntington, West Virginia, U.S.
 The Herald-Mail, Hagerstown, Maryland, U.S.
 The Herald-Palladium, Michigan, U.S.
 Herald Sun, Melbourne, Victoria, Australia
 Innis Herald, a college newspaper in Ontario, Canada. See List of newspapers in Canada
 Lexington Herald-Leader, Lexington, Kentucky, U.S.
 Los Angeles Herald Examiner
 Metro Herald (Irish newspaper)
 Metro Herald (Virginia)
 Newnan Times-Herald, Newnan, Georgia, U.S.
 El Nuevo Herald, Miami, Florida, U.S.
 O Heraldo, Goa, India
 Omaha World-Herald, Omaha, Nebraska, U.S.
 Record Herald, formerly Washington C.H. Record-Herald, Washington Court House, Ohio, U.S.
 The Record Herald,  Waynesboro, Pennsylvania, U.S.
 Sun Herald, Biloxi, Mississippi, U.S.
 Swansea Herald of Wales, south Wales
 Telegraph Herald, Dubuque, Iowa, U.S.
 Times Herald-Record, Middletown, New York, U.S.
 Torquay Herald Express, South Devon, England
 Universal Circulating Herald, Hong Kong, China